Cryptobatrachus boulengeri, also known as Boulenger's backpack frog, is a species of frogs in the family Hemiphractidae. It is endemic to Sierra Nevada de Santa Marta in northern Colombia. The specific name honours George Albert Boulenger, an eminent herpetologist.

Description
Adult males measure  and adult females  in snout–vent length. The snout is relatively long. The tympanum is larger in males than in females. The dorsolateral folds are thin. Skin on the dorsum is finely granular with scattered larger warts. The fingers have no webbing. The finger and toe tips bear expanded disks. Subarticular adhesive pads are present.

Female frogs carry the eggs on their back. The eggs have direct development, hatching as froglets (i.e., there is no free-living larval stage).

Habitat and conservation
This species is abundant throughout its range, but it is threatened by habitat loss caused by agriculture (particularly coffee plantations), logging, and infrastructure development. Deforestation around streams is a particular threat. Additional potential threats are chytridiomycosis and pollution from agrochemicals. However, its range includes a number of protected areas, including the Sierra Nevada de Santa Marta and Tayrona National Natural Parks.

References

Cryptobatrachus
Amphibians of Colombia
Amphibians of the Andes
Endemic fauna of Colombia
Amphibians described in 1916
Taxa named by Alexander Grant Ruthven
Taxonomy articles created by Polbot
Sierra Nevada de Santa Marta